Giacomo Soffiantino (1 January 1929 – 27 May 2013) was an Italian painter and artist mainly known for his abstract works.

Career
He has exhibited at the Venice Biennial in 1956, 1958, 1964, 1972 and at the Rome Quadriennial in 1964 and in 1973.

1929 births
2013 deaths
Painters from Turin
20th-century Italian painters
Italian male painters
21st-century Italian painters
20th-century Italian male artists
21st-century Italian male artists